Winterswijk West is a railway station in Winterswijk, Netherlands. The station opened on 10 June 2001 and is located on the Zutphen–Winterswijk railway. The train services are operated by Arriva.

Train services

Bus services

There is no bus services at this station. The nearest bus stop is at the Groenloseweg.

External links
NS website 
Arriva website 
Dutch Public Transport journey planner 

Railway stations in Gelderland
Railway stations opened in 2001
Winterswijk